Herold Georg Wilhelm Johannes Schweickerdt (28 February 1903, Schmie, Baden-Württemberg – 21 February 1977, Pretoria) was a German botanist.

In 1904 he moved with his parents to Pretoria, where he later studied at Transvaal University. From 1922 to 1924 he was a student at the University of Bonn (1922–24), later becoming a professor in Pretoria. From 1940 to 1964 he served as inspector of the Botanical Garden at the University of Göttingen.

During his career he collected plants in Transvaal, South-West Africa, Rhodesia, Mozambique and Natal. The plant species Gasteria schweickerdtiana is named after him.

The H.G.W.J Schweickerdt Herbarium (PRU) at the University of Pretoria is named in his honour.

Publications 
 Untersuchungen über Photodinese bei Vallisneria spiralis, 1928 - Studies on photodinese in Vallisneria spiralis.

References 

20th-century German botanists
1977 deaths
1903 births
Scientists from Baden-Württemberg
Academic staff of the University of Pretoria
German emigrants to South Africa